Manor High School is a school with academy status for boys and girls, aged 11 to 16 years (school years 7 to 11). The school serves a suburban area to the south of the City of Leicester, although it falls outside the city's administrative boundaries, within the district of Oadby and Wigston in Leicestershire. The school has specialist technology status.

History 
Manor High School originally opened in 1968 taking children from 10 to 14 years of age, just the 4 academic years. The first headmaster was Walter Higgins. The current headmaster is Liam Powell, who arrived at the school in 2013.

Campus 
The school is situated on a campus shared with the neighbouring Brookside Primary School in the north-east of the borough of Oadby along with Pebbles Nursery.

Curriculum 
The school was one of only four of its kind in England in providing education for students aged 10 to 14. It was part of the system introduced in Leicestershire to provide for the introduction of comprehensive secondary education in the 1970s. Students transferred from primary schools at the age of 10, and sat National Curriculum Tests in the core subjects of English, Mathematics and Science after eight months at the school.

The school is now a secondary school and provides education for students aged 11 to 16 (school years 7 to 11).

References

External links 
Manor High School website
https://www.compare-school-performance.service.gov.uk/school/137120

Secondary schools in Leicestershire
Academies in Leicestershire
Educational institutions established in 1968
1968 establishments in England